was a Japanese politician. He was first elected to the Diet of Japan in 1972, representing a district in southern Tottori Prefecture.  A member of the Social Democratic Party, he served as construction minister and chief cabinet secretary in the cabinet led by Prime Minister Tomiichi Murayama. Liberal Democratic Party politician Yōhei Kōno described Nosaka as "the main player" in forming the LDP-SDP coalition governments of the mid-1990s.

References

|-

1924 births
2004 deaths
Members of the House of Representatives (Japan)
Social Democratic Party (Japan) politicians